Doctor Thorne is the third novel written by Anthony Trollope in his Chronicles of Barsetshire series, between Barchester Towers and Framley Parsonage.  It was published by Chapman and Hall in London in 1858. The idea of the plot was suggested to Trollope by his brother Thomas. Though set in Barsetshire, Barchester and its familiar residents have little part in the proceedings. The novel is mainly concerned with money and position. 

Most of the narrative is based in the village of Greshamsbury, the seat of squire John Newbold Gresham, of an old and respected family, and his wife Lady Arabella, sister of the Earl de Courcy. They have a son and several daughters. The titular Doctor Thorne lives in the village with his niece Mary. She has grown up with the Gresham children and since the doctor is well acquainted with squire Gresham, Mary spends a great deal of time at Greshamsbury Hall. Mary's parentage is a mystery to the general public in the novel, but it is one of Trollope's most insistent principles to take the reader into his confidence. Since Mary Thorne has neither family background nor money, Lady Arabella discourages her from associating with her erstwhile playmates once they grow up. However, unbeknownst to nearly everyone, Mary's maternal uncle, Roger Scatcherd, has risen from humble beginnings to great wealth.

Plot summary
When their father dies, Doctor Thomas Thorne and his younger brother Henry are left to fend for themselves. Thomas begins to establish a medical practice, while Henry seduces Mary Scatcherd, the sister of stonemason Roger Scatcherd. When Roger finds out that Mary has become pregnant, he kills Henry in a fight.

While her brother is in prison for the death, Mary gives birth to a girl. A former suitor offers to marry Mary and emigrate to America to start a new life, but not if she keeps the baby. Doctor Thorne persuades Mary to accept the offer, promising to raise his niece. He names her Mary Thorne, but, wishing neither to have her illegitimacy made public nor to have her associated with the uncouth Roger Scatcherd, he keeps her parentage secret. Mary Scatcherd tells her brother that the baby has died.

After his release from prison, Scatcherd rises quickly in the world, becoming extremely rich. When he completes a seemingly impossible important project on time, he is made a baronet. Throughout his career, he entrusts his financial affairs to Doctor Thorne. When Thorne becomes the family doctor to the Greshams, he persuades Scatcherd to lend increasing sums to the head of the family, the local squire. Eventually, much of the Gresham estate is put up as collateral.

Meanwhile, Mary Thorne grows up with the Gresham children and becomes a great favourite with the whole family.

As young adults, Mary and Frank Gresham — the only son and heir of the squire of Greshamsbury — fall in love. However, his parents need him to marry wealth; the squire has squandered much money on expensive and fruitless campaigns for a seat in Parliament and is grieved that he can leave little to his son. As Mary is penniless and of suspect birth, such a marriage is inconceivable to his mother and to the de Courcys, the Greshams' aristocratic relatives. They wish Frank to marry the 30-year-old, eccentric heiress Martha Dunstable instead. Frank reluctantly visits Courcy Castle in order to meet Miss Dunstable, and they become friends. He foolishly and playfully proposes, but she wisely demurs, knowing that he does not love her.

Sir Roger Scatcherd is a chronic drunkard, and Doctor Thorne tries in vain to get him to curtail his drinking. In his will, Scatcherd stipulates that the bulk of his estate goes to his only son, the dissolute Louis Philippe. However, he leaves Doctor Thorne in control of the inheritance until Louis Philippe reaches the age of 25. Should Louis die before then, Scatcherd stipulates that the estate goes to his sister Mary's eldest child. Thorne, knowing that Scatcherd is thinking of the children Mary had in America, is forced to divulge Mary's parentage to Scatcherd, but Scatcherd leaves the will unchanged.

Roger Scatcherd eventually dies of drink. The son proves just as much an alcoholic as the father, and his weaker constitution quickly brings him to the same end before he turns 25. After consulting with lawyers, Doctor Thorne confirms that his niece Mary is the heiress—now richer than even Miss Dunstable.

Unaware of these developments, the still resolute Frank finally persuades his doting father to consent to his marriage to Mary. When all is revealed, the rest of his relatives heartily congratulate him.

Characters

The Thornes
Dr Thomas Thorne, the uncle of Mary Thorne, who works as a doctor and apothecary. He is the confidant of both Squire Gresham and Sir Roger.
Mary Thorne, the niece of Dr. Thorne and Sir Roger

The Scatcherds
Sir Roger Scatcherd
Lady Scatcherd, wife of Sir Roger and mother of Louis Philippe. She was Frank Gresham's wet nurse when he was a child and remains very fond of him.
Sir Louis Philippe Scatcherd

The Greshams
Mr Francis Newbold Gresham, senior, the squire of Greshamsbury
Lady Arabella, his wife, née de Courcy, who is most anxious for Frank to "marry money"
Francis "Frank" Newbold Gresham, junior, the squire's eldest child, only son and heir
Augusta Gresham, Frank's youngest sister
Beatrice Gresham, Frank's younger sister and Mary Thorne's best friend

The de Courcys
The Earl de Courcy, Lady Arabella Gresham's brother
Lady de Courcy, wife of the earl
Lady Alexandrina, their eldest daughter

The Oriels
Caleb Oriel, a clergyman who later marries Beatrice Gresham
Patience Oriel, Caleb's sister, and a close friend of Beatrice

Others
 The Duke of Omnium, an extremely wealthy bachelor who figures in a number of Trollope's Barsetshire and Palliser novels
 Martha Dunstable, a kind-hearted, wealthy heiress of the "oil of Lebanon" business
 Mr. Moffat, one-time suitor of Miss Augusta Gresham, who later withdraws his proposal (to seek a more advantageous match) and is horsewhipped by Frank for it
 Dr. Fillgrave, a Barchester doctor who detests Dr Thorne

Adaptations

An ITV adaptation, Doctor Thorne, aired on 6 March 2016. The script was written by Julian Fellowes, the creator and scriptwriter for Gosford Park and Downton Abbey.

See also

Illegitimacy in fiction

Notes

External links

 
 Anthony Trollope – Comprehensive summaries of all of Trollope's plots and characters as well as information on all things Trollopian.
 
 Gutenberg edition of Doctor Thorne.

1858 British novels
British novels adapted into television shows
Novels by Anthony Trollope
Novels about alcoholism